Various alternatives have been put forward over time to change the existing date of Australia Day. There have also been proposals to institute a second day specifically for Indigenous Australians in addition to the existing date, which is often referred to as Invasion Day by opponents. Polling has shown a marked shift towards support for a change of date or second day of celebration since 2000, though around two thirds of respondents in recent years have supported the current date. Various proposals for the name and date of a new holiday have been put forward.

Background 

Both before the establishment of Australia Day as the national day of Australia, and in the years after its creation, several dates have been proposed for its celebration and, at various times, the possibility of moving Australia Day to an alternative date has been mooted. Some reasons put forward are that the current date, celebrating the foundation of the Colony of New South Wales, lacks national significance; that the day falls during school holidays which limits the engagement of schoolchildren in the event; and that it fails to encompass members of the Indigenous community and some others who perceive the day as commemorating the date of an invasion of their land. Connected to this is the suggestion that moving the date would be seen as a significant symbolic act.

Some Australians regard Australia Day as a symbol of the adverse impacts of British settlement on Australia's Indigenous peoples.

In 1888, prior to the first centennial anniversary of the First Fleet landing on 26 January 1788, New South Wales premier Henry Parkes was asked about inclusion of Aboriginal people in the celebrations. He replied: "And remind them that we have robbed them?" 

The celebrations in 1938 were accompanied by an Aboriginal Day of Mourning.

The Aboriginal Tent Embassy was established outside Old Parliament House, Canberra, on Australia Day in 1972, and celebrated 50 years of existence in 2022.

A large gathering of Aboriginal people in Sydney in 1988 led an "Invasion Day" commemoration marking the loss of Indigenous culture. Some Indigenous figures and others continue to label Australia Day as "Invasion Day", and protests occur almost every year, sometimes at Australia Day events. Thousands of people participate in protest marches in capital cities on Australia Day; estimates for the 2018 protest in Melbourne range into tens of thousands.

The anniversary is also termed by some as "Survival Day" and marked by events such as the Survival Day concert, first held in Sydney in 1992, celebrating the fact that the Indigenous people and culture have survived despite colonisation and discrimination. In 2016, National Indigenous Television chose the name "Survival Day" as its preferred choice on the basis that it acknowledges the mixed nature of the day, saying that the term "recognises the invasion", but does not allow that to frame the entire story of the Aboriginal people.

Amongst those calling for change have been Tony Beddison, then chairman of the Australia Day Committee (Victoria), who argued for change and requested debate on the issue in 1999; and Mick Dodson, Australian of the Year in 2009, who called for debate as to when Australia Day was held.

Official celebrations have sought to include Indigenous people, holding ceremonies such as the Woggan-ma-gule ceremony, held in Sydney, which honours the past and celebrates the present.

Political responses 
A move to change the date would have to be made by a combination of the Australian federal and state governments, and has lacked sufficient political and public support. In 2001, Prime Minister John Howard stated that he acknowledged Aboriginal concerns with the date, but that it was nevertheless a significant day in Australia's history, and thus he was in favour of retaining the current date. He also noted that 1 January, which was being discussed in light of the Centenary of Federation, was inappropriate as it coincided with New Year's Day. In 2009 Prime Minister Kevin Rudd gave a "straightforward no" to a change of date, speaking in response to Mick Dodson's suggestion to reopen the debate. The opposition leader, Malcolm Turnbull, echoed Rudd's support of 26 January, but, along with Rudd, supported the right of Australians to raise the issue. At the state level, New South Wales Premier Nathan Rees stated that he was yet to hear a "compelling argument" to support change, and Queensland Premier Anna Bligh expressed her opposition to a change.

In June 2017 the annual National General Assembly of the Australian Local Government Association voted (by a majority of 64–62) for councils to consider how to lobby the federal government for a date change. In August 2017 the council of the City of Yarra, a local government of Melbourne, resolved unanimously that it would no longer refer to 26 January as Australia Day and would cease to hold citizenship ceremonies on that day; an event acknowledging Aboriginal culture and history was to be held instead. The City of Darebin later followed suit. The federal government immediately deprived the councils of their powers to hold citizenship ceremonies. Byron Shire Council became the third council to have its power to have citizenship ceremonies stripped.

In 2018, Prime Minister Scott Morrison rejected moving Australia Day and proposed the addition of another day for Indigenous Australians. He noted that the Australia Capital Territory holds a Reconciliation Day public holiday on May 28, marking the anniversary of the successful 1967 referendum. Morrison remarked, "we don't have to pull Australia Day down to actually recognise the achievements of Indigenous Australia, the oldest living culture in the world; the two can coexist". Frontbencher and future Minister for Indigenous Australians Ken Wyatt called the proposal "a great step forward" and suggested holding it during NAIDOC Week in July.

On 13 January 2019, Scott Morrison announced that, with effect from Australia Day 2020, all local councils would be required to hold citizenship ceremonies on and only on 26 January and 17 September; there would also be a dress code, banning thongs and board shorts.

Crowds estimated as high as 80,000 turned out in an "Invasion Day" protest in Melbourne in 2019, and rallies were held across the country.

On 12 November 2019, following an online survey, the Inner West Council became the first local authority in Sydney to end Australia Day celebrations, encouraging residents instead to attend the Aboriginal Yabun festival held on that day. The council still holds citizenship ceremonies on Australia Day.

On 23 February 2021, the City of Mitcham became the first local council in South Australia to vote to officially oppose the date of Australia Day. Mayor Dr Holmes-Ross said she felt “comfortable with the council holding events on Australia Day, but I don’t feel comfortable with the date of Australia Day”.

In January 2023, Queensland LNP MP Henry Pike drafted a bill that would keep Australia Day on 26 January.

Suggested alternatives

1 January (Federation of Australia) 

As early as 1957, 1 January was suggested as a possible alternative day, to commemorate the Federation of Australia. In 1902, the year after Federation, 1 January was named "Commonwealth Day". However, New Year's Day was already a public holiday, and Commonwealth Day did not gather much support.

19 January (alternative federation date) 
Proposed as an alternative because it is only one week earlier than Australia Day and "19/01" can represent the year of Federation.

3 March (Australia Act) 

There has been support for an "independence day", 3 March, to represent the enacting of the Australia Act 1986.

25 April (Anzac Day) 

There has been a degree of support by some in recent years for making Anzac Day, 25 April, Australia's national day, including in 1999, by Anglican Archbishop of Brisbane Peter Hollingworth. In 2001, following comments made during a review into the future of Anzac Day, the idea of a merger was strongly opposed by Prime Minister John Howard and Opposition Leader Kim Beazley, who clarified his earlier position.

8 May ("mate") 

Starting 2017, there has been a partly serious suggestion to move Australia day to 8 May.

9 May (opening of Provisional Parliament House) 

The date 9 May is also sometimes suggested, the date on which the first federal seat of parliament was opened in Melbourne in 1901, the date of the opening of the Provisional Parliament House in Canberra in 1927, and the date of the opening of the New Parliament House in 1988. The date has, at various times, found support from former Queensland Premier Peter Beattie, Tony Beddison, and Geoffrey Blainey. However, the date has been seen by some as being too closely connected with Victoria, and its location close to the start of winter has been described as an impediment.

27 May (1967 referendum) 

The anniversary of the 1967 referendum to amend the federal constitution has also been suggested. The amendments enabled the federal parliament to legislate with regard to Indigenous Australians and allowed for Indigenous Australians to be included in the national census. The public vote in favour was 91%.

9 July (acceptance of the Constitution) 

This is the date when Queen Victoria accepted the Constitution of Australia.

1 September (Wattle Day) 

Wattle Day is the first day of spring in the southern hemisphere. Australia's green and gold comes from the wattle, and it has symbolised Australia since the early 1800s. Wattle Day has been proposed as the new date for Australia Day since the 1990s and is supported by the National Wattle Day Association.

8 September 
This was the day Australia was first circumnavigated, by Matthew Flinders and Bungaree.

24 October (Tenterfield Oration) 

On 24 October 1889 Sir Henry Parkes, the "Father of Federation", gave his pivotal speech at Tenterfield in NSW, which set the course for federation.

3 December (Eureka Stockade) 

The Eureka Stockade on 3 December has had a long history as an alternative choice for Australia Day, having been proposed by The Bulletin in the 1880s. The Eureka uprising occurred in 1854 during the Victorian gold rush, and saw a failed rebellion by the miners against the Victorian colonial government. Although the rebellion was crushed, it led to significant reforms, and has been described as being the birthplace of Australian democracy. Supporters of the date have included senator Don Chipp and former Victorian Premier Steve Bracks. However, the idea has been opposed by both hard-left unions and right-wing nationalist groups, both of whom claim symbolic attachment to the event, and by some who see it as an essentially Victorian event.

Polling

2000s 
In 2004, a Newspoll poll that asked if the date of Australia Day should be moved to one that is not associated with European settlement found 79% of respondents favoured no change, 15% favoured change, and 6% were uncommitted. Historian Geoffrey Blainey said in 2012 that he believed 26 January worked well as Australia Day and that it was at that time more successful than it had ever been.

2010s 
A January 2017 poll conducted by McNair yellowSquares for The Guardian found that 68% of Australians felt positive about Australia Day, 19% were indifferent and 7% had mixed feelings, with 6% feeling negative about Australia Day. Among Indigenous Australians, however, only 23% felt positive about Australia Day, 31% were negative and 30% had mixed feelings, with 54% favouring a change of date. A September 2017 poll conducted by Essential Polling for The Guardian found that 54% were opposed to changing the date; 26% of Australians supported changing the date and 19% had no opinion.

A poll conducted by progressive public policy think tank The Australia Institute in 2018 found that 56% do not mind what day it is held. The same poll found that 49% believe that the date should not be on a date that is offensive to Indigenous Australians, but only 37% believed the current date was offensive.

Prior to Australia Day 2019, the conservative public policy think tank Institute of Public Affairs (IPA) published the results of a poll in which 75% of Australians wanted the date to stay, while the new nationalist Advance Australia Party's poll had support at 71%. Both groups asked questions about pride in being Australian prior to the headline question.

The Social Research Centre, a subsidiary of the Australian National University, also released a report in January 2019. Their survey found that, when respondents know that 26 January is the anniversary of the arrival of the First Fleet at Port Jackson, 70% believe it is the best date for Australia Day, and 27% believe it is not. The report includes demographic factors which affect people's response, such as age, level of education, and state or territory of residence. Those who did not support 26 January as the best date then indicated their support for an alternate date. The three most supported dates were 27 May, 1 January and 8 May.

2020s 
Polling by Essential Media since 2015 suggests that the number of people celebrating Australia Day is declining, indicating a shift in attitudes. In 2019, 40% celebrated the day; in 2020, 34%, and in 2021 it was down to 29% of over 1000 people surveyed. In 2021, 53% said that they were treating the day as just a public holiday.

An IPA poll commissioned in December 2020 and published in January 2021 showed that support for changing the date had remained a minority position. In January 2021, an Essential poll reported that 53% supported a separate day to recognise Indigenous Australians; however only 18% of these thought that it should replace Australia Day. A poll by Ipsos for The Age / The Sydney Morning Herald reported in January 2021 that 28% were in support of changing the date, 24% were neutral and 48% did not support changing the date. 49% believed that the date would change within the next decade and 41% believed that selecting a new date would improve the lives of Indigenous Australians. Results were split by demographic factors, with age being a significant factor. 47% of people aged 18–24 supported changing the date, compared to only 19% among those aged 55 years or older. Individuals who voted for the Greens were most likely to support the date change at 67%, followed by Labor voters at 31% and Coalition voters at 23%.

A January 2022 IPA poll found 65% were opposed to changing the date, including 47% of 18–24 year olds, with 15% of the general population and 25% of 18–24 year olds in favour of changing it. However an Essential poll around the same time reported growing support for a change of date or an additional day of celebration for Indigenous Australians, at nearly 60%.

A January 2023 Roy Morgan poll found that 64% said that 26 January should be known as "Australia Day". A majority of respondents under 35 favoured "Invasion Day", as did a majority of Greens supporters. Support for the name "Australia Day" was up across every age group compared to the year prior, with support for the name up by eight percentage points among respondents aged 18-24. Majorities of men, women, capital city residents, country residents, Coalition and Labor supporters and respondents in each state favoured "Australia Day".

References 

Proposals in Australia
Political movements in Australia
Annual protests
Controversies in Australia